In fishing, incidental catch is that part of the catch which was not originally targeted, but was caught and retained anyway. It can be contrasted with discards, which is that part of the catch which was not originally targeted, but was caught and returned to the sea, and bycatch, which is for all the species caught apart from the targeted species.

The operational definitions used by the FAO for incidental catch and other related catches are as follows:

 Target catch: The catch of a species or species assemblage which is primarily sought in a fishery, such as shrimp, flounders, cods
 Incidental catch: Retained catch of non-targeted species
 Discarded catch (usually shortened to discards): That portion of the catch returned to the sea as a result of economic, legal, or personal considerations.
 Bycatch: Discarded catch plus incidental catch.

Notes

References

 Johnson, Douglas H; Shaffer, Terry L and Gould, Patrick J (1990) Incidental Catch of Marine Birds in the North Pacific High Seas Driftnet Fisheries U.S. Geological Survey.
 Valdemarsen, John W Incidental catch of seabirds in longline fisheries UN Atlas of the Oceans: Fishery Technology Service.

Environmental impact of fishing